Cape Eleuthera Airport  was a public use airport located 3 nm east-southeast of Cape Eleuthera, The Bahamas.  The airport is closed, and the runway is not usable.

See also
List of airports in the Bahamas

References

External links 
 Airport record for Cape Eleuthera Airport at Landings.com

Defunct airports
Airports in the Bahamas
Eleuthera